Oleksandr Zats (born 8 September 1976) is a Ukrainian politician, People's Deputy of Ukraine of the 5th, 6th and 7th convocations and a member of the Party of Regions.

References

1976 births
Politicians from Donetsk
Party of Regions politicians
Fifth convocation members of the Verkhovna Rada
Sixth convocation members of the Verkhovna Rada
Seventh convocation members of the Verkhovna Rada
Living people
Recipients of the Honorary Diploma of the Cabinet of Ministers of Ukraine